David Salvador-Estepa (born 20 October 1973) is a Spanish former professional tennis player.

Salvador, who comes from Catalonia, was a national representative at the World Youth Cup, alongside Àlex Corretja.

Active on tour during the 1990s, Salvador's career included a win over Emilio Sánchez at the 1996 Alicante Challenger and an ATP Tour singles main draw appearance at the 1997 Torneo Godó. He reached a best singles ranking of 253.

References

External links
 
 

1973 births
Living people
Spanish male tennis players
Tennis players from Catalonia